Shqipran Skeraj (Serbo-Croat: Šćipran Skeraj; born 24 November 1985) is a Kosovar former professional footballer who played as a left-back. He made one appearance for the Kosovo national team.

Personal life
Skeraj was born in Prizren, SFR Yugoslavia and raised in Berlin. His younger brother Agron Skeraj is also a professional footballer. He played on trial with Swedish side Djurgården for three months in 2011.

References

External links
 

1985 births
Living people
Sportspeople from Prizren
Kosovan footballers
Association football defenders
FC Prishtina players
KF Liria players
SpVgg Greuther Fürth players
TuS Koblenz players
Kosovan expatriate footballers
Kosovan expatriate sportspeople in Germany
Albanian expatriate sportspeople in Germany
Expatriate footballers in Germany